Mahonri is a given name. Notable people with the name include:

Mahonri Montes (born 1989), Mexican boxer
Mahonri Ngakuru (born 2000), New Zealand rugby union footballer
Mahonri Schwalger (born 1978), Samoan rugby union footballer 
Mahonri Young (1877–1957), American sculptor and artist